The Corn da Camp (also known as Corno di Campo) is a mountain of the Livigno Alps, located in Graubünden, Switzerland. On its northern side lies a glacier named Vedreit da Camp.

References

External links
 
 Corn da Camp on Hikr

Mountains of the Alps
Mountains of Switzerland
Alpine three-thousanders
Mountains of Graubünden